Milo Matanović (1871–1955) was a Serbian brigadier who formed a new government in Montenegro at the behest of King Nicholas I of Montenegro during World War I, but all to no avail. In Serbian historiography, Matanović is a patriotic figure. He also served as Prime Minister of Montenegro from 1915 to 1916 before becoming president in 1917, but ultimately through political pressure was forced to resign.

References 

1871 births
1955 deaths
Prime Ministers of Montenegro
Serbian military leaders
Defence ministers of Montenegro